California Proposition 65 may refer to:

 California Proposition 65 (1986) (passed) The Safe Drinking Water and Toxic Enforcement Act of 1986. Requires public notice of products containing dangerous or carcinogenic chemicals.
 California Proposition 65 (2004) (failed) would have protected local jurisdiction revenues from state government encroachment.
 California Proposition 65 (2016) (failed) would have mandated sale of carryout (reusable tote) bags.